The 2008 Erie RiverRats season was the 2nd season for the American Indoor Football Association (AIFA) franchise.

On January 8, 2008 the RiverRats announced they would be leaving the Mon Valley in favor of Erie for the 2008 season, renaming themselves the Erie RiverRats.  They replaced the city's previous AIFA team, the Erie Freeze. The RiverRats have several Freeze connections, including many of the Freeze's best players: QB/WR David Dinkins, cornerback Jovon Johnson (himself an Erie native), kicker J.R. Cipra, center Jonathon Sitter, and defensive tackle Roosevelt Benjamin. AIFA owner Michael Mink stated that he considers the RiverRats to be a consolidation of the original RiverRats and the Freeze with the team retaining the RiverRats name, franchise and management structure.

The RiverRats started the season 3–0 with Dinkins missing a game due to work obligations, that ultimately moved him to wide receiver so that Jarrod Highberger could start at quarterback. After 3 starts with Highberger, the team had lost 2 games in a row, with the later being focused on Highberger's interceptions, the team signed Rod Rutherford, a former NFL backup, as the starting quarterback. Rutherford gave the offense an instant shot in the arm, as he guided the team to a 7–2 record the rest of the season, earning the 2nd seed in the Northern Division. The RiverRats traveled to Reading for their playoff game, and were leading in the 4th quarter when the Express took a lead with 15.2 seconds remaining. Erie was able to get the ball at the Express 9-yard line with 5.7 seconds remaining, but Rutherford was unable to score, throwing an incompletion and was intercepted on the last play, and returned 50-yards for a touchdown.

At the end of the 2008 season, five RiverRats (QB Rod Rutherford, OL Anthony Peluso, K J. R. Cipra, LB Glenroy Watkins, & LB Roosevelt Benjamin) were named onto the AIFA Eastern Conference All-Star team.

Schedule

Regular season

¶ Exhibition match

Standings

 Green indicates clinched playoff berth
 Purple indicates division champion
 Grey indicates best league record

Roster

References

Erie Explosion seasons
2008 in sports in Pennsylvania